The Church of St. Anthony, or simply Church of Tuzi (Kisha e Tuzit), is a Franciscan Roman Catholic church located in the center of the town of Tuzi, near Podgorica, Montenegro, serving mostly the Albanian community. It was built between 1930 and 1999, based on the Zagreb Cathedral.

References

Roman Catholic churches in Montenegro
Podgorica Municipality
1930 establishments in Yugoslavia